Ibrahim Omar Ibrahim Hamzi (died September 2015) was a brigadier general of the Royal Saudi Land Forces, deputy commander of the 8th Armoured Brigade near Jizan. He was killed during the Saudi-led intervention in the Yemeni civil war in late September 2015, being one of the most senior officers of the coalition of Arab nations to be killed. Hamzi died while being taken to a hospital.

References

Saudi Arabian military personnel killed in the Yemeni Civil War (2014–present)
Brigadier generals
2015 deaths
Deaths by firearm in Saudi Arabia